Iatrogenesis is the causation of a disease, a harmful complication, or other ill effect by any medical activity, including diagnosis, intervention, error, or negligence. First used in this sense in 1924, the term was introduced to sociology in 1976 by Ivan Illich, alleging that industrialized societies impair quality of life by overmedicalizing life. Iatrogenesis may thus include mental suffering via medical beliefs or a practitioner's statements. Some iatrogenic events are obvious, like amputation of the wrong limb, whereas others, like drug interactions, can evade recognition. In a 2013 estimate, about 20 million negative effects from treatment had occurred globally. In 2013, an estimated 142,000 persons died from adverse effects of medical treatment, up from an estimated 94,000 in 1990.

Iatrogenic avenues

Risk associated with medical interventions
Adverse effects of prescription drugs or vaccines
 Overuse of drugs (causing, for example, antibiotic resistance in bacteria)
 Prescription drug interaction

Medical errors 
 Incorrect prescription, perhaps due to illegible handwriting or computer typos
 Faulty procedures, techniques, information, methods, or equipment
 Negligence
 Hospital-acquired infections

Causes and consequences

Medical error and negligence
Iatrogenic conditions need not result from medical errors, such as mistakes made in surgery, or the prescription or dispensing of the wrong therapy, such as a drug. In fact, intrinsic and sometimes adverse effects of a medical treatment are iatrogenic. For example, radiation therapy and chemotherapy—necessarily aggressive for therapeutic effect – frequently produce such iatrogenic effects as hair loss, hemolytic anemia, diabetes insipidus, vomiting, nausea, brain damage, lymphedema, infertility, etc. The loss of function resulting from the required removal of a diseased organ is iatrogenic, as in the case of diabetes consequential to the removal of all or part of the pancreas.

The incidence of iatrogenesis may be misleading in some cases. For example, a ruptured aortic aneurysm is fatal in most cases; the survival rate for treatment of a ruptured aortic aneurysm is under 25%. Patients who die during or after an operation will still be considered iatrogenic deaths, but the procedure itself remains a better bet than the probability of death if left untreated.

Other situations may involve actual negligence or faulty procedures, such as when pharmacotherapists produce handwritten prescriptions for drugs.

Another situation may involve negligence where patients are brushed off and not given proper care due to providers holding prejudice for reasons such as sexual orientation, ethnicity, religion, immigration status, etc. This can cause patients to feel like they aren’t worthy of being treated which can cause deaths and mistrust between patients and providers which is dangerous. Mistrust between providers and patients is extremely harmful as this causes patients to not go in for treatment resulting in many more deaths.

Adverse effects
A very common iatrogenic effect is caused by drug interaction, i.e., when pharmacotherapists fail to check for all medications a patient is taking and prescribe new ones that interact agonistically or antagonistically (thereby potentiating or attenuating the intended therapeutic effect). Such situations can cause significant morbidity and mortality. Adverse reactions, such as allergic reactions to drugs, even when unexpected by pharmacotherapists, are also classified as iatrogenic.

The evolution of antibiotic resistance in bacteria is iatrogenic as well. Bacterial strains resistant to antibiotics have evolved in response to the over prescription of antibiotic drugs.

Certain drugs and vaccines are toxic in their own right in therapeutic doses because of their mechanism of action. Alkylating antineoplastic agents, for example, cause DNA damage, which is more harmful to cancer cells than regular cells. However, alkylation causes severe side-effects and is actually carcinogenic in its own right, with potential to lead to the development of secondary tumors. In a similar manner, arsenic-based medications like melarsoprol, used to treat trypanosomiasis, can cause arsenic poisoning.

Some medications have been reported to uncommonly induce long-lasting post-discontinuation syndromes; examples of these iatrogenic disorders include post-SSRI sexual dysfunction (PSSD), post-finasteride syndrome (PFS) and post-retinoid syndrome/post-Accutane syndrome (PRSD/PAS). The aforementioned three conditions exhibit widely overlapping symptoms, most prominently sexual dysfunction and cognitive issues, and are currently poorly-understood owing to a lack of research.

Adverse effects can appear mechanically. The design of some surgical instruments may be decades old, hence certain adverse effects (such as tissue trauma) may never have been properly characterized.

Psychiatry
In psychiatry, iatrogenesis can occur due to misdiagnosis (including diagnosis with a false condition, as was the case of hystero-epilepsy). An example of a partially iatrogenic condition due to common misdiagnosis is bipolar disorder, especially in pediatric patients. Other conditions such as somatoform disorder and chronic fatigue syndrome are theorized to have significant sociocultural and iatrogenic components. Posttraumatic stress disorder is hypothesized to be prone to iatrogenic complications based on treatment modality. Even use of antipsychotic drugs leads to loss of brain mass.

The psychiatric treatment of some conditions and populations, such as substance abuse are regarded as carrying risks for iatrogenesis. At the other end of the spectrum, dissociative identity disorder is considered by a minority of theorists to be a wholly iatrogenic disorder with the bulk of diagnoses arising from a tiny fraction of practitioners.

The degree of association of any particular condition with iatrogenesis is unclear and in some cases controversial. The over-diagnosis of psychiatric conditions (with the assignment of mental illness terminology) may relate primarily to clinician dependence on subjective criteria. The assignment of pathological nomenclature is rarely a benign process and can easily rise to the level of emotional iatrogenesis, especially when no alternatives outside of the diagnostic naming process have been considered. Many former patients come to the conclusion that their difficulties are largely the result of the power relationships inherent in psychiatric treatment, which has led to the rise of the anti-psychiatry movement.

Iatrogenic poverty
Meessen et al. used the term "iatrogenic poverty" to describe impoverishment induced by medical care. Impoverishment is described for households exposed to catastrophic health expenditure or to hardship financing. Every year, worldwide, over 100,000 households fall into poverty due to health care expenses. A study reported that in the United States in 2001, illness and medical debt caused half of all personal bankruptcies. Especially in countries in economic transition, the willingness to pay for health care is increasing, and the supply side does not stay behind and develops very fast. But the regulatory and protective capacity in those countries is often lagging behind. Patients easily fall into a vicious cycle of illness, ineffective therapies, consumption of savings, indebtedness, sale of productive assets, and eventually poverty.

Social and cultural iatrogenesis
The 20th-century social critic Ivan Illich broadened the concept of medical iatrogenesis in his 1974 book Medical Nemesis: The Expropriation of Health by defining it at three levels.
First, clinical iatrogenesis is the injury done to patients by ineffective, unsafe, and erroneous treatments as described above. In this regard, he described the need for evidence-based medicine 20 years before the term was coined.
Second, at another level social iatrogenesis is the medicalization of life in which medical professionals, pharmaceutical companies, and medical device companies have a vested interest in sponsoring sickness by creating unrealistic health demands that require more treatments or treating non-diseases that are part of the normal human experience, such as age-related declines. In this way, aspects of medical practice and medical industries can produce social harm in which society members ultimately become less healthy or excessively dependent on institutional care. He argued that medical education of physicians contributes to medicalization of society because they are trained predominantly for diagnosing and treating illness, therefore they focus on disease rather than on health. Iatrogenic poverty (above) can be considered a specific manifestation of social iatrogenesis.
Third, cultural iatrogenesis refers to the destruction of traditional ways of dealing with, and making sense of, death, suffering, and sickness. In this way the medicalization of life leads to cultural harm as society members lose their autonomous coping skills. It is worth noting that in these critiques "Illich does not reject all benefits of modern society but rejects those that involve unwarranted dependency and exploitation."

Epidemiology
Globally it is estimated that 142,000 people died in 2013 from adverse effects of medical treatment, an increase of 51 percent from 94,000 in 1990. In the United States, estimated deaths per year include:

 12,000 due to unnecessary surgery
 7,000 due to medication errors in hospitals
 20,000 due to other errors in hospitals
 80,000 due to nosocomial infections in hospitals
 106,000 due to non-error, negative effects of drugs

Based on these figures, iatrogenesis may cause as many as 225,000 deaths per year in the United States (excluding recognizable error). An earlier Institute of Medicine report estimated 230,000 to 284,000 iatrogenic deaths annually.

History

The term iatrogenesis means brought forth by a healer, from the Greek ἰατρός (iatros, "healer") and γένεσις (genesis, "origin"); as such, in its earlier forms, it could refer to good or bad effects.

Since at least the time of Hippocrates, people have recognized the potentially damaging effects of medical intervention. "First do no harm" (primum non nocere) is a primary Hippocratic mandate in modern medical ethics. Iatrogenic illness or death caused purposefully or by avoidable error or negligence on the healer's part became a punishable offense in many civilizations.

The transfer of pathogens from the autopsy room to maternity patients, leading to shocking historical mortality rates of puerperal fever (also known as "childbed fever") at maternity institutions in the 19th century, was a major iatrogenic catastrophe of the era. The infection mechanism was first identified by Ignaz Semmelweis.

With the development of scientific medicine in the 20th century, it could be expected that iatrogenic illness or death might be more easily avoided. Antiseptics, anesthesia, antibiotics, better surgical techniques, evidence-based protocols and best practices continue to be developed to decrease iatrogenic side effects and mortality.

See also

 Adverse drug reaction
 Bioethics
 Bloodletting
 Cascade effect
 Classification of Pharmaco-Therapeutic Referrals
 Fatal Care: Survive in the U.S. Health System
 Hospital-acquired infection
 Journal of Negative Results in Biomedicine
 List of medicine contamination incidents
 Medical malpractice
 Medicalization
 Nocebo
 Patient safety
 Placebo
 Polypharmacy
 Pressure ulcer
 Quaternary prevention
 Risk–benefit ratio
 Sentinel event

Notes

References

External links
 Patient Safety Network (US)

Medical ethics
Health care quality
Medical error
Social problems in medicine